Hiberno-Latin, also called Hisperic Latin, was a learned style of literary Latin first used and subsequently spread by Irish monks during the period from the sixth century to the tenth century.

Vocabulary and influence
Hiberno-Latin was notable for its curiously learned vocabulary. While neither Hebrew nor Greek was widely known in Europe during this period, odd words from these sources, as well as from Irish and British sources, were added to Latin vocabulary by these authors. It has been suggested that the unusual vocabulary of the poems was the result of the monks learning Latin words from dictionaries and glossaries which did not distinguish between obscure and common words; unlike many others in Western Europe at the time, the Irish monks did not speak a language descended from Latin.  During the sixth and seventh centuries AD, Irish monasticism spread through Christian Europe; Irish monks who founded these monasteries often brought Hiberno-Latin literary styles with them.

Notable authors whose works contain something of the Hiberno-Latin spirit include St Columba, St Columbanus, St Adamnan, and Virgilius Maro Grammaticus. John Scotus Eriugena was probably one of the last Irish authors to write Hiberno-Latin wordplay. St Hildegard of Bingen preserves an unusual Latin vocabulary that was in use in her convent, and which appears in a few of her poems; this invention may also be influenced by Hiberno-Latin.

A brief excerpt from a poem on the dawn from the  shows the Irish poet decorating his verses with Greek words:

(Thus the very word , plural  – a pseudo-archaic coinage from the classical verb , 'to speak' – is first recorded in the metrical Gospels  of Juvencus. Similarly, the word-arrangement often follows the sequence adjective 1 - adjective 2 - verb - noun 1 - noun 2, known as the "golden line", a pattern used to excess in the too-regular prosody of these poets; the first line quoted above is an example.) The underlying idea, then, would be to cast ridicule on these Vatican-oriented writers by blending their stylistic tricks with incompetent scansion and applying them to unworthy subjects.

On a much more intelligible level, the sixth-century abecedarian hymn  shows many of the features of Hiberno-Latin: the word , the "first sower" meaning creator, refers to God using an unusual neologism. The text of the poem also contains the word , meaning "hands;" this is probably from Hebrew .  The poem is also an extended alphabetical acrostic, another example of the wordplay typical of Hiberno-Latin. Irish (but not Continental) manuscripts traditionally attributed the poem to the sixth-century Irish mystic Saint Columba, but this attribution is doubtful. Marking with an asterisk (*) words that are learned, neologisms, unusually spelled, or unusual in the context they stand, the poem begins:

Modern influence
James Joyce's work Finnegans Wake preserves something of the spirit of Hiberno-Latin in English.

Similar usage
 In Italian, Francesco Colonna created a similar style (in prose), packed with neologisms drawn from Hebrew, Greek and Latin, for his allegory  (1499).
 The Spanish Golden Century poet Luis de Góngora was the champion of culteranismo (sometimes called gongorism in English), a style that subjected Spanish to abstruse Latinate neologism, obscure allusions to Classical mythology and violent hyperbaton.
 In English, euphuism – a 16th-century tendency named after the character Euphues who appears in two works by its chief practitioner John Lyly – shows similar qualities.

See also
 Hermeneutic style

References

Bibliography 
James Carney, Medieval Irish Lyrics Berkeley, 1967.
 Thomas Owen Clancy and Gilbert Márkus, Iona: the Earliest Poetry of a Celtic Monastery  Edinburgh, 1995.
Michael Herren, editor, The Hisperica Famina. (Pontifical Institute of Mediaeval Studies, Toronto)
Volume 1, 1974. 
Volume 2, 1987. 
Andy Orchard, "The Hisperica famina as Literature" University of Toronto, 2000.

External links 
 Clavis Litterarum Hibernensium: Medieval Irish Books & Textss, c. 400 - c. 1600, http://www.brepols.net/Pages/ShowProduct.aspx?prod_id=IS-9782503548579-1
 

Languages attested from the 6th century
Latin language
Forms of Latin
Irish culture
Early medieval Latin literature
Latin texts of medieval Ireland
Macaronic language
History of Christianity in Ireland